Pojmański  may refer to:

Grzegorz Pojmański - Polish astronomer
Comet Pojmański (C/2006 A1) - Comet discovered by Grzegorz Pojmański